The Banaras- New Delhi Superfast Express is a Superfast Express train belonging to North Eastern Railway zone that runs between Banaras and New Delhi in India. It is currently being operated with 12581/12582 train numbers on a daily basis.

Service

Route and halts 

The important halts of the train are:

Traction

Both trains are hauled by a Ghaziabad Loco Shed based WAP 7 or WAP 5 electric locomotive from Banaras to New Delhi.

Time Table

From Banaras to New Delhi it starts with Number 12581 and time table is as:From New Delhi to Banaras it starts with Number 12582 and time table is as:

Coach composition

This train has 23 coaches between Banaras Station to New Delhi station.

 1 AC 1 Tier Coach (H1)
 2 AC 2 Tier Coach (A1-A2)
 8 AC 3 Tier Coach (B1-B6 & BE1-BE2)
 5 Sleeper class Coach (S1-S5)
 4 General compartments (unreserved)
 1 SLR
 1 EOG
 1 HCP

Coach composition for 12581 BSBS-NDLS Superfast Express:

Coach composition for 12582 NDLS-BSBS Superfast Express:

See also 

 New Delhi railway station
 Banaras railway station
 Shiv Ganga Express

Notes

References

External links 

 12581/Manduadih - New Delhi SF Express
 12582/New Delhi - Manduadih SF Express

Passenger trains originating from Varanasi
Transport in Delhi
Express trains in India
Rail transport in Delhi
Railway services introduced in 2015